Urška Hrovat (born 18 February 1974 in Ljubljana, SR Slovenia, SFR Yugoslavia) is a retired Slovenian alpine skier. She competed at three Winter Olympics.

World Cup results

Season standings

Race podiums
 5 wins (5 SL)
 14 podiums (13 SL, 1 GS)

Olympic Games results

World Championships results

References 

1974 births
Living people
Slovenian female alpine skiers
Alpine skiers at the 1992 Winter Olympics
Alpine skiers at the 1994 Winter Olympics
Alpine skiers at the 1998 Winter Olympics
Olympic alpine skiers of Slovenia
Skiers from Ljubljana